Corpuscularianism (from the Latin corpusculum meaning "little body") is a set of theories that explain natural transformations as a result of the interaction of particles (minima naturalia, partes exiles, partes parvae, particulae, and semina). It differs from atomism in that corpuscles are usually endowed with a property of their own and are further divisible, while atoms are neither. Although often associated with the emergence of early modern mechanical philosophy, and especially with the names of Thomas Hobbes, René Descartes, Pierre Gassendi, Robert Boyle, Isaac Newton, and John Locke, corpuscularian theories can be found throughout the history of Western philosophy.

Overview
Corpuscularianism is similar to the theory of atomism, except that where atoms were supposed to be indivisible, corpuscles could in principle be divided.  In this manner, for example, it was theorized that mercury could penetrate into metals and modify their inner structure, a step on the way towards the production of gold by transmutation.  Corpuscularianism was associated by its leading proponents with the idea that some of the apparent properties of objects are artifacts of the perceiving mind, that is, "secondary" qualities as distinguished from "primary" qualities. Corpuscularianism remained a dominant theory for centuries and was blended with alchemy by early scientists such as Robert Boyle and Isaac Newton in the 17th century.

In his work The Sceptical Chymist (1661), Boyle abandoned the Aristotelian ideas of the classical elements—earth, water, air, and fire—in favor of corpuscularianism. In his later work, The Origin of Forms and Qualities (1666), Boyle used corpuscularianism to explain all of the major Aristotelian concepts, marking a departure from traditional Aristotelianism.

The philosopher Thomas Hobbes used corpuscularianism to justify his political theories in Leviathan. It was used by Newton in his development of the corpuscular theory of light, while Boyle used it to develop his mechanical corpuscular philosophy, which laid the foundations for the Chemical Revolution.

Alchemical corpuscularianism

William R. Newman traces the origins from the fourth book of Aristotle, Meteorology. The "dry" and "moist" exhalations of Aristotle became the alchemical 'sulfur' and 'mercury' of the eighth-century Islamic alchemist, Jābir ibn Hayyān (died c. 806–816). Pseudo-Geber's Summa perfectionis contains an alchemical theory in which unified sulfur and mercury corpuscles, differing in purity, size, and relative proportions, form the basis of a much more complicated process.

Importance to the development of modern scientific theory

Several of the principles which corpuscularianism proposed became tenets of modern chemistry.

The idea that compounds can have secondary properties that differ from the properties of the elements which are combined to make them became the basis of molecular chemistry. 
The idea that the same elements can be predictably combined in different ratios using different methods to create compounds with radically different properties became the basis of stoichiometry, crystalography, and established studies of chemical synthesis. 
The ability of chemical processes to alter the composition of an object without significantly altering its form is the basis of fossil theory via mineralization and the understanding of numerous metallurgical, biological, and geological processes.

See also 
Atomic theory
Atomism
Classical element
History of chemistry

References 

Atomism
History of chemistry
13th century in science
Metaphysical theories